Notogrammitis billardierei, also known as the common finger-fern, or common strap fern, is a small epiphytic or lithophytic fern [1] with small, strap like fronds, found commonly in wet forest in South-Eastern Australia and New Zealand.

Description 
Notogrammitis billardierei is a small fern that typically grows on trunks, dead logs, and rocks [2]. It has leathery, dark green, narrow fronds. The fronds are 7-15 cm long, and 4-7 mm wide, with entire margins and obvious midveins. The sporangia are grouped into oblong sori rather than the more common circular sori, and these oblong sori are angled obliquely on either side of the midvein on the underside of each frond [3]. The fronds are unbranching but are crowded together, each originating from the rhizome [1].

Notogrammitis billardierei is of the division polypodiophyta, and thus does not produce flowers, cones, or seeds, instead reproducing sexually through spores.

Taxonomy and naming 
The genus, Notogrammitis, comes from the Greek word Noto meaning 'southern' and gramma meaning 'line'. Notogrammitis was previously categorised as a part of the genus Grammitis. The species, billardierei, was named in honour of Jacques Houttou de Labillardiere, a 19th century French botanist. It was named by Carl Ludwig Willdenow, a German botanist.

Habitat and distribution 
Notogrammitis billardierei is widespread in rainforest and moist open forest in Tasmania, New Zealand, and the Eastern coast of Australia in Victoria, New South Wales, and Queensland [4].

It commonly grows on fallen trees and on tree ferns, but also grows on rocks and living trees. It requires moist, sheltered conditions to grow, making it much more frequent on South-East facing hillsides than North-west facing hillsides [6].

Cultivation 
Cultivation of Notogrammitis billardierei is limited as it is generally unavailable commercially, and its growing conditions are limited by its epiphytic nature [1]. For successful cultivation, it must be treated with delicacy and kept moist. The most common way to cultivate Notogrammitis billardierei is by mounting it epiphytically on a tree fern, such as Dicksonia antarctica.

References 
1.  "Notogrammitis billardierei". Yarra ranges council. Retrieved 12 February 2023.

2.      Barbara S. Parris. 1998. "Grammitidaceae" pages 450-468. In: Anthony E. Orchard (executive editor) and Patrick M. McCarthy (volume editor). Flora of Australia volume 48, Ferns, Gymnosperms, and Allied Groups. ABRS/CSIRO: Melbourne, Australia.

3. Wiltshire, R and Dalton, P, FernFlip: Life size guide to the common ferns of Tasmania, University of Tasmania, pp. 32 (2021) [Published Creative Work

4.  "Notogrammitis billardierei". P. G. Wilson. Retrieved 15 February 2023.

5. "Notogrammitis billardierei". Atlas of Living Australia. Retrieved 19 February 2023.

6. A. Taylor, K. Burns. 2016. Radial distributions of air plants: a comparison between epiphytes and mistletoes. Ecology 97(4), 819-825. 

Polypodiaceae
Flora of New South Wales
Flora of Tasmania
Flora of Victoria (Australia)
Flora of New Zealand
Flora of the Auckland Islands
Taxa named by Carl Ludwig Willdenow